Khaybatovo (Häybät) is a rural locality (a village) in Urgalinsky Selsoviet, Belokataysky District, Bashkortostan, Russia. The population was 143 as of 2010. There are 3 streets.

Geography 
Khaybatovo is located 51 km southeast of Novobelokatay (the district's administrative centre) by road. Morozovka is the nearest rural locality.

References 

Rural localities in Belokataysky District